Viveca or Viveka is a female given name, although Viveka can be a male given name in India. Notable people with these names include:

Viveka (lyricist), Indian male lyricist working on Tamil language films and television, active 1999–present
Viveka Babajee (1973–2010), Mauritian model and actress, Miss Mauritius World 1993, Miss Mauritius Universe 1994
Viveka Davis (born 1969), American actress 
Viveka Eriksson or Viveca Eriksson (born 1956), politician on the autonomous Åland Islands, Premier of Åland 2007–2011
Viveca Hollmerus (1920–2004), Finnish-Swedish author
Viveca Lärn (born 1944), Swedish writer
Viveca Lindfors (1920–1995), Swedish stage and film actress
Viveca Lindfors (figure skater) (born 1999), Finnish figure skater
Viveca Novak, American journalist
Viveca Paulin (born 1969), Swedish actress and auctioneer
Viveka Seldahl (1944–2001), Swedish actress
Viveca Serlachius (1923–1993), Finnish-born Swedish actress
Viveca Sten (born 1959), Swedish writer and lawyer
Viveca Vázquez, Puerto Rican choreographer and dancer

See also
Vivica